Deadpool is an action-adventure video game based on the Marvel Comics antihero of the same name. It was developed by High Moon Studios and published by Activision for Microsoft Windows (in digital format only), PlayStation 3, and Xbox 360 in June 2013. Written by Daniel Way, the game's story follows Deadpool as he joins forces with the X-Men and Cable to thwart Mister Sinister's latest scheme, getting into numerous comedic adventures along the way. Similarly to other media featuring the character, the game includes self-referential humor and numerous fourth wall breaks.

Upon release, the game received mixed reviews, being praised for its humor and plot elements while being critiqued for deficiencies in its gameplay. Deadpool, along with most other games published by Activision that had used the Marvel license, was de-listed and removed from all digital storefronts in 2014. As of July 15, 2016, the game was made available to purchase again on Steam as well as PlayStation Store's downloadable content but only in the US markets. The game was re-released on November 18, 2015 on PlayStation 4 and Xbox One to coincide with the release of the 2016 film based on the character. On November 16, 2017, the game was once again removed from digital storefronts due to licensing issues.

Gameplay
Deadpool is an action hack and slash, third-person shooter video game. Gameplay mostly consists of fighting enemies using both melee weapons and guns, with new combos becoming available to Deadpool as he progresses through the story and obtains upgrade points. The game frequently breaks the fourth wall by having Deadpool verbally interact with the player based on their skill and progress.

By default, Deadpool is armed with both guns and swords, but he also has access to giant hammers, plasma guns, and a range of other weapons. A short range of teleportation moves are possible as well. As he slowly falls apart while sustaining damage, players must avoid further damage in order to recover. The game also features several stealth segments, where Deadpool is able to eliminate enemies silently with either his melee weapons or guns, though gun "stealth" kills will immediately alert all nearby enemies.

Plot
When Deadpool's pitch for "the most awesome game ever" starring himself is rejected by High Moon Studios, he sets off explosives at the studio, forcing them to cooperate. He even hires Nolan North as his voice actor. When the game's script is delivered to him, Deadpool, finding it boring, draws all over it with a red crayon.

Following the first few lines of the script, Deadpool sets out to assassinate corrupt media mogul Chance White. He storms White's media headquarters, slaughtering his mercenaries before tackling himself and White out of the latter's penthouse window and into the sewers (blowing the game's budget in the process by repeating the events for kicks). However, White escapes with the Marauders, forcing Deadpool to give chase. Along the way, he experiences the first of many glitches (the result of Deadpool blowing the game's budget) and is forced to call High Moon multiple times to coerce/bribe them into finishing the game. After killing Marauders member Arclight, Deadpool finds White meeting with Mister Sinister, who has Blockbuster kill him once informed that the mogul's satellites are under his control. Angered at losing his bounty, Deadpool kills Vertigo, knocks out Blockbuster, and confronts Mr. Sinister, who effortlessly reduces him to a disembodied head before leaving with Blockbuster.

After regenerating, Deadpool awakens to see X-Men members Wolverine, Rogue, Psylocke, and Domino, who reveal they are trying to foil Sinister's plot to conquer the world with his army of clones. Joining them, Deadpool flies the Blackbird to Genosha, Sinister's hideout, but crashes the plane. The X-Men remain out cold, despite Deadpool's comedic attempts to slap Wolverine awake. While wandering through Genosha, Deadpool runs into Cable, who has come from the future to ensure that Sinister's plan does not succeed, as it will inadvertently destroy the world. However, a bored Deadpool ends the conversation by shooting himself in the head. He awakens later to find a note from Cable urging him to hurry or he'll miss an "incredibly large-breasted" fangirl. This motivates Deadpool to regroup with Cable, only to learn there is no fangirl. After Cable explains that a security tower is broadcasting a signal to keep the X-Men unconscious, Deadpool infiltrates it and discovers Sinister wired into it. Messing with the controls, Deadpool blows up the tower and kills Sinister, only to learn from Cable that it was just a clone.

Cable convinces Deadpool to help by telling him that his favorite taco restaurant will be destroyed along with the rest of the world if Sinister isn't stopped. Deadpool reconfigures a Sentinel boot into a flying machine to take him to Magneto's citadel, only to crash into Rogue in mid-air. The pair land in an abandoned mutant prison where Blockbuster kidnaps Rogue, prompting Deadpool to try and save her while planning to seduce her. He briefly abandons his quest upon spotting Sinister, whom he kills, only to learn it was another clone. Eventually, Deadpool kills Blockbuster and rescues Rogue, who absorbs his regenerating powers via kissing to heal herself, leaving Deadpool temporarily weakened.

As Rogue battles Sinister's incoming soldiers, Deadpool is briefly killed when his dog, Mr. Shuggums, brings a grenade he threw back to him, and is reunited with his lover Death. She reveals that Sinister has been exhuming mutant bodies to obtain their unique DNA, and asks for Deadpool's help in retrieving the mutant's suffering souls so that they could pass on peacefully. Coming back to life, Deadpool finds himself in Genosha's catacombs, where he must help Cable kill Sinister's soldiers before going on a spirit quest to retrieve the souls for death. Once he succeeds, the catacombs cave-in, foiling Sinister's plan.

After reuniting with Wolverine on the surface, Deadpool goes to Magneto's citadel, killing Sinister's remaining soldiers, as well as clones of the Marauders and Sinister. The X-Men arrive to help, but Sinister easily overpowers them, only to be crushed by Deadpool's Sentinel boot. Cable confirms that this was the real Sinister, and Deadpool calls for the end credits. As the credits roll, Deadpool is thrilled with how great his game is and talks to High Moon's representative Peter Della Penna, who admits that he didn't really blow their budget. Deadpool proceeds to do so by causing multiple explosions during the credits.

Development
Deadpool was first announced at the 2012 San Diego Comic Con. Only a teaser trailer was shown, without platforms to be shown. Shortly after the announcement, an article was unveiled on Marvel's official website confirming the development of the game; the article was written from Deadpool's point of view, saying he hired High Moon Studios to make him a game. Prior to the game's release, the lead designer of the game revealed the basics of the plot in an interview with IGN, saying Deadpool has taken over the studio and is in charge of the game's development. The game was created using Epic Games' Unreal Engine 3 technology, which also powers Transformers: Fall of Cybertron. The game's budget was $100 million, making it one of the most expensive video games developed.

During High Moon's panel at Comic-Con, a censored version of the trailer was shown twice after an actor dressing up as Deadpool appeared on stage with the developers. Another marketing campaign started with billboards taking the appearance of graffiti covering advertisements for The Amazing Spider-Man, presumably made by Deadpool to crudely advertise his video game. GameSpot later released an advertisement of the game, with Deadpool giving a holiday greeting while telling people to pre-order the game, stating that it would be released in 2013.

Peter Della Penna revealed later in a press release that Daniel Way had written the story for the game, bringing his signature Deadpool humor to the title. According to Penna, "we weren't actually planning on making a Deadpool game. But, Deadpool came by the studio one day, said he was taking over, and that if I didn't hire Marvel writer Daniel Way pronto and make the most amazing Deadpool video game, he'd break both of our arms and beat us to death with them. I have kids, so we're making the game".

Marketing
High Moon Studios announced a "watch and win" sweepstakes that ran during the Spike Video Game Awards, which aired on December 8, 2012. The winner of the contest would be flown to High Moon Studios and will appear as an in-game character in the Deadpool video game. The winner appears in the game as a unique big-headed enemy that Deadpool mentions was supposed to be the pizza delivery man at the start of the game. The winner of this contest was Bill Salina, a Database Administrator from Atlanta, GA.  He appears as the character Storm Thrower, who as he is attacked will name off pizzas.

Release
The game was released for Microsoft Windows, PlayStation 3 and Xbox 360. A Microsoft Windows version had been announced, with a full list of achievements available in the Deadpool video game, having been leaked via the digital distributor Steam. The ESRB rating page was also updated to list a PC version of the game.

Pre-orders were announced by several retail outlets. GameStop and EBGames released the Merc with a Map Pack DLC. Two new maps are also added, the GRT Plaza and Inside the Tower to Deadpool Challenge mode, and also two bonus costumes, the D-Pooly and Uncanny X-Force suits only for use in the unlockable Infinite mode where stats are tracked on a global leaderboard.

On January 1, 2014, Activision's license to create games with Marvel comics characters expired, resulting in Deadpool: The Video Game and numerous other Marvel titles published by Activision to be removed from online storefronts such as Steam and PSN.

On August 31, 2015, Activision announced that they would remaster the game for the PlayStation 4 and Xbox One. The game was re-released in November 17 in North America and Australia, and November 20 in the United Kingdom. It is unknown how Activision reacquired the rights to re-publish Deadpool, but it is believed that the re-release was timed to help promote the then-upcoming Deadpool feature film, released a few months after the next-gen version of the game.

Reception

High Moon Studios showed an early demo of the video game to journalists at Gamescom 2012, where the game earned a nomination for Best of Show. Several sites wrote positive impression of the demo that was shown at Gamescom and the Electronic Entertainment Expo (E3), also including Joystiq and GameSpot.

Deadpool received "mixed" reviews on all platforms according to the review aggregation website Metacritic. Critics praised the humor, the original story, and the keeping true to the comics, but criticized the repetitive gameplay, controls and combat.

411Mania gave the Xbox 360 version a score of 7.1 out of 10 and said, "Deadpool isn’t going to win any end of the year awards, but not every game has to. There are a couple of points where the game really shines. When it strays from the formula of typical 3rd person action games, and wasn’t afraid to make fun of itself or the genre, things were great. One part in particular where Deadpool leaves the camera behind and tells you to keep up. You use the camera to catch up to him. It is a very short segment, and was without consequence, but it strayed from the typical stuff. Unfortunately, those points are few and far between. While the gameplay can become a bit repetitive, I found myself continuing to play, and enjoying myself enough from the humor in the game". GameZone gave the game seven out of ten and called it "a fun little romp. If you can tolerate Deadpool's demented humor, you'll find a nice few hours of entertainment within the game". The Escapist gave it a score of three-and-a-half stars out of five and said, "Deadpool can be surprisingly fun. The combat's well put together and there are some genuinely hilarious moments in the story, but it has its share of controller-throwing difficulty problems and hit-or-miss jokes, many that aren't quite as funny if you play through the game more than once". Digital Spy gave the PlayStation 3 version three stars out of five and said it was "far from a bad game, yet the developers' over-reliance on the appeal of the source material means it rarely shoots for the stars". However, The Digital Fix gave the Xbox 360 version five out of ten and said it was "Nowhere near as awesome as Deadpool would have you believe". Edge gave the same console version three out of ten and said, "while we’ll accept that Deadpool the character is an acquired taste, this is an indisputably poor game, one whose knowing winks and quips come off not as metacommentary but as tacit apologia for its litany of specific failings".

Removal
All digital copies of all Marvel/Activision games, including X-Men: Destiny and Spider-Man: Shattered Dimensions, were removed from Steam, Xbox Live, and PlayStation Network, due to an expired contract between Marvel Studios and Activision. Activision no longer had a right to make downloadable content, trading cards, and patches to the game. Despite this, on July 15, 2015, Deadpool was made available for purchase on Steam for PC again. The title was made no longer available to purchase from the Steam store again on November 16, 2017, but players who purchased it while it was available are still able to download and play the game through the Steam client.

References

External links

 
 
 

2013 video games
Action-adventure games
Activision games
Deadpool in other media
Delisted digital-only games
Hack and slash games
M-Rated Marvel Comics video games
Metafictional video games
Video games about ninja
PlayStation 3 games
PlayStation 4 games
Self-reflexive video games
Third-person shooters
Superhero video games
Unreal Engine games
Video games set in Africa
Video games set in New York City
Windows games
Xbox 360 games
Xbox One games
Video games developed in the United States
Single-player video games
High Moon Studios games
Mercenary Technology games